Debiopharm  is a family-owned biopharmaceutical company active in drug development and manufacturing of proprietary drugs, diagnostics, and investments, headquartered in Lausanne, Switzerland. It was founded in 1979 by Rolland-Yves Mauvernay.

History 
Rolland-Yves Mauvernay founded Debiopharm in 1979 in Martigny. In 1981, the Cytotech laboratory was created in Switzerland and after a few years it became Debio Recherche Pharmaceutique (R.P.). Initially, the company worked on interferon and, in 1982, it began to focus on triptorelin, after having acquired the rights for its development from Tulane University. The first marketing authorization for triptorelin, a gonadotropin-releasing hormone GnRH) agonist that is approved for several indications, including advanced prostate cancer and endometriosis was obtained in France in 1986.

In 1989, Debiopharm acquired the license for oxaliplatin from Nagoya City University. oxaliplatin is a diaminocyclohexane (DACH) platin, the drug was first approved in Europe in 1996 and became a worldwide standard treatment in metastatic colorectal cancer.

In September 2004, after having occupied different premises in Lausanne, Debiopharm moved its headquarters to the current address. In 2016, the company employed 350 people.

In March 2021, Merck KGaA announced the acquisition of Debiopharm's xevinapant program in head and neck cancer for 900 million euros.

Subsidiaries 
The group works through its subsidiaries:
 Debiopharm International SA, which in-licenses product candidates or technologies, develops them, and then licenses them to third parties for commercialization;  
 Debiopharm Research and Manufacturing SA, which provides contract manufacturing and contract research services to Debiopharm;
 Debiopharm Investment SA, which manages the group's money and invests in real estate and in other companies; and
 Debiopharm Innovation Fund SA, which invests in Digital Health companies and provides strategic funding and guidance for companies with an ambition to improve the patient journey, re-imagine how clinical trials are conducted, along with companies offering digital platforms that support cutting-edge drug technologies.

As of 2010 two drugs had reached the market through its efforts: oxaliplatin for the treatment of cancer, and depot formulations of triptorelin, a gonadotropin-releasing hormone agonist that is approved to treat advanced prostate cancer.

In 2017, Debiopharm acquired a phase 2 drug candidate from ImmunoGen that intends to target Non-Hodgkin lymphoma.

References

External links
 Official website

Biopharmaceutical companies
Multinational companies headquartered in Switzerland
Pharmaceutical companies of Switzerland
Biotechnology companies of Switzerland
Biotechnology companies established in 1979
Companies based in Lausanne
Pharmaceutical companies established in 1979